The 1888 United States House of Representatives elections in South Carolina were held on November 6, 1888, to select seven Representatives for two-year terms from the state of South Carolina.  All seven incumbents were initially reported as re-elected and the composition of the state delegation remained solely Democratic, however Thomas E. Miller successfully contested the result in the 7th congressional district, claiming voter suppression of black Republican votes.

1st congressional district
Incumbent Democratic Congressman Samuel Dibble of the 1st congressional district, in office since 1883, defeated Republican challenger S.W. McKinlay.

General election results

|-
| 
| colspan=5 |Democratic hold
|-

2nd congressional district
Incumbent Democratic Congressman George D. Tillman of the 2nd congressional district, in office since 1883, defeated Republican challenger Seymour E. Smith.

General election results

|-
| 
| colspan=5 |Democratic hold
|-

3rd congressional district
Incumbent Democratic Congressman James S. Cothran of the 3rd congressional district, in office since 1887, was unopposed in his bid for re-election.

General election results

|-
| 
| colspan=5 |Democratic hold
|-

4th congressional district
Incumbent Democratic Congressman William H. Perry of the 4th congressional district, in office since 1885, defeated D.R. Duncan in the Democratic primary was unopposed in the general election.

General election results

|-
| 
| colspan=5 |Democratic hold
|-

5th congressional district
Incumbent Democratic Congressman John J. Hemphill of the 5th congressional district, in office since 1883, was unopposed in his bid for re-election.

General election results

|-
| 
| colspan=5 |Democratic hold
|-

6th congressional district
Incumbent Democratic Congressman George W. Dargan of the 6th congressional district, in office since 1883, was unopposed in his bid for re-election.

General election results

|-
| 
| colspan=5 |Democratic hold
|-

7th congressional district
Incumbent Democratic Congressman William Elliott of the 7th congressional district, in office since 1887, defeated Republican challenger Thomas E. Miller.  However, Miller successfully contested the election in the Republican controlled House of Representatives and replaced Elliott in September 1890.

General election results

|-
| 
| colspan=5 |Democratic hold
|-

See also
United States House of Representatives elections, 1888
South Carolina gubernatorial election, 1888
South Carolina's congressional districts

References

"Supplemental Report of the Secretary of State to the General Assembly of South Carolina." Reports and Resolutions of the General Assembly of the State of South Carolina. Volume I. Columbia, SC: James H. Woodrow, 1889, pp. 561–564.

South Carolina
1888
South Carolina